After gaining its independence from the Soviet Union in 1992, Moldova became a member of FIFA in 1994. Football is the most popular sport in Moldova.

National team

The national team has limited international success and have never qualified for a European Championship or World Cup.

In UEFA Euro 2004 qualifiers, Moldova beat Austria 1–0 and Belarus 2–1, but lost to the Netherlands 2–1. 

In the 2006 FIFA World Cup qualifiers, their best results were winning against Belarus 2–0, and two home draws against Scotland and Norway. They also drew 2–2 against Bosnia and Herzegovina at home, and beat them 1–0 in the away game during the UEFA Euro 2008 qualifiers. In the same qualifications, they beat Hungary 3–0 and also drew 1–1 against Turkey.

Domestic football

FC Sheriff Tiraspol is the most successful Moldovan football team and has won the most championships.

League system

References

External links
 Official site of the Moldovan Football Federation
 Football teams in Moldova